This is list of institutions accredited by the European Quality Improvement System (EQUIS) as at 2021.

Alphabetical

A
Aalto University School of Business (Aalto University) — Helsinki, 
Aarhus School of Business (Aarhus University) — Aarhus, 
Adam Smith Business School, University of Glasgow — Glasgow, 
Alliance Manchester Business School, University of Manchester — Manchester, 
Amsterdam Business School (Amsterdam University) — Amsterdam, 
Antai College of Economics & Management (Shanghai Jiao Tong University) — Shanghai, 
Ashridge Business School — Ashridge, 
Aston Business School (Aston University) — Aston, 
AUC School of Business (American University in Cairo) — Cairo, 
Auckland Business School (Auckland University) — Auckland, 
Audencia Nantes School of Management — Nantes, 
Australian School of Business (University of New South Wales) - Sydney,

B
Babson College — Wellesley, MA, 
University of Bath School of Management — Bath, 
Beedie School of Business (Simon Fraser University) — Burnaby, 
Bentley University — Waltham, MA, 
BI Norwegian Business School — Oslo, 
Birmingham Business School (Birmingham University) — Birmingham, 
Bologna Business School — Bologna, 
Bond Business School — Gold Coast, 
Bordeaux Management School — Bordeaux, 
Bradford School of Management (Bradford University) — Bradford, 
Brisbane Graduate School of Business (Queensland University of Technology) — Brisbane, 
Burgundy School of Business — Dijon,

C
Catholic University of Portugal — Lisbon, 
Cass Business School (City University London) — London, 
Skema Business School — Valbonne, 
China Europe International Business School — Shanghai, 
College of Commerce, National Chengchi University — Taipei,  (ROC)
Copenhagen Business School — Copenhagen, 
Coppead Graduate School of Business (Rio de Janeiro Federal University) — Rio de Janeiro, 
Cranfield School of Management (Cranfield University) — Cranfield, 
Pontifical Catholic University of Peru Centrum Graduate Business School — Lima,

D
Division of Business (University of South Australia) — Adelaide, 
Division of Management and Accountancy (Mexico Autonomous Institute of Technology) — Mexico City, 
Durham Business School (Durham University) — Durham,

E
EADA Business School,  (3 years)
EBS University of Business and Law — Oestrich-Winkel, 
EDHEC - Business School, 
EM Lyon, Lyon, 
ESADE Business School, 
ESCEM School of Business and Management — Poitiers and Tours, 
ESC Lille business school, 
Escola de Administração de Empresas de São Paulo, Fundação Getulio Vargas (EAESP/FGV), 
ESCP Europe, 
ESMT, Berlin, 
ESSCA, Angers-Paris-Shanghai-Budapest, 
ESSEC, Paris-Singapore, 
Euromed Management — 
University of Exeter Business School — Exeter,

F
 Faculdad de Administración, Universidad de los Andes, Colombia (3 years)
 Faculdade de Economia da Universidade Nova de Lisboa,  (3 years)
 Faculté des Sciences de l'Administration, Université Laval,  (3 years)
 Faculty of Business Administration, Simon Fraser University,  (3 years)
 Faculty of Business Administration, University of Economics, Prague, CZ (3 years)
 Faculty of Business and Economics, The University of Hong Kong,  (5 years)
 Faculty of Business and Economics, University of Lausanne, 
 Faculty of Business, City University of Hong Kong, Shek Kip Mei,   (3 years)
 Faculty of Business, QUT - Queensland University of Technology,  (3 years)
 Faculty of Business, The Hong Kong Polytechnic University, Hung Hom,  (3 years)
 Faculty of Business Administration, University of Macau,  (3 years)
 Faculty of Economics and Business, KU Leuven,  (5 years)
 Faculty of Economics and Business Administration, Universiteit Maastricht,  (3 years)
 Faculty of Economics, Business Administration and IT, University of Zurich,  (3 years)
 Faculty of Economics, University of Ljubljana, SI (3 years)
 Faculty of Management, Economics and Social Sciences, University of Cologne, 
 Faculty of Management, University of Warsaw, 
 Frankfurt School of Finance & Management, 
 Fundação Dom Cabral,  (3 years)

G
Graduate School of Business (Cape Town University) — Cape Town, 
Graduate School of Management (Saint Petersburg State University) - Saint Petersburg, 
Goldman Academy — Lisbon, 
Gordon Institute of Business Science (University of Pretoria) - Johannesburg, South Africa
Grenoble Graduate School of Business — Grenoble,

H
Hanken School of Economics — Helsinki, 
HEC Lausanne (University of Lausanne) — Lausanne, 
HEC Montréal (University of Montreal) — Montreal, 
HEC Paris — Jouy-en-Josas, 
Henley Business School (Reading University) — Reading, 
Hult International Business School — London, 
Hult International Business School — Boston, 
Hult International Business School — San Francisco,

I
IAE Universidad Austral — Buenos Aires, 
IAE, IAE Aix-en-Provence — 
ICN Graduate Business School (University of Nancy) — Nancy, 
IE Business School — Madrid, 
IESA - Instituto de Estudios Superiores de Administración,  (3 years)
IESE Business School,  (5 years)
IESEG School of Management, 
IMD -International Institute for Management Development,  (5 years)
Imperial College Business School (Imperial College London) — London, 
INCAE Business School — Alajuela,  and Managua, 
Indian Institute of Management Ahmedabad — Ahmedabad, 
Indian Institute of Management Bangalore — Bangalore, 
Indian Institute of Management Calcutta — Kolkata, 
Indian Institute of Management Indore - Indore,  
Indian Institute of Management Kozhikode - Kozhikode,  
Indian School of Business - Hyderabad, 
INSEAD —  and 
ISEG - Lisbon School of Economics and Management (Universidade de Lisboa) — Lisbon,

J
Judge Business School (Cambridge University) — Cambridge, 
Jönköping International Business School (Jönköping University) — Jönköping,

K
KU Leuven's Faculty of Economics and Business (Katholieke Universiteit Leuven) - Leuven, 
Koç University Graduate School of Business (Koç University) — Istanbul, 
Korea University Business School (Korea University) — Seoul, 
Kozminski University — Warsaw,

L
Lancaster University Management School (Lancaster University) — Lancaster, 
Lee Kong Chian School of Business (Singapore Management University) — 
Leeds University Business School (Leeds University) — Leeds, 
London Business School (University of London) — London, 
Loughborough University Business School (Loughborough University) — Loughborough, 
Louvain School of Management (Louvain Catholic University) — Louvain-la-Neuve, 
LUISS Business School (LUISS University) — Rome, 
Lund School of Economics and Management (Lund University) — Lund,

M
Mannheim Business School (Mannheim University) — Mannheim, 
Melbourne Business School — Melbourne, 
Macquarie Graduate School of Management (Macquarie University) — 
Miami Herbert Business School (University of Miami) — 
Michael G. Foster School of Business (University of Washington) — Seattle, 
Politecnico di Milano — Milan, 
Monash Faculty of Business and Economics (Monash University) — Melbourne, 
Moscow School of Management SKOLKOVO — Moscow, 
Desautels Faculty of Management (McGill University) — Montreal,

N
Nanyang Business School (Nanyang Technological University) — 
School of Management (National Taiwan University of Science and Technology) —  (ROC)
Norwegian School of Economics (NHH) — Bergen, 
Nottingham University Business School — Nottingham, 
Nottingham Business School — Nottingham, 
Nyenrode Business University — Breukelen, 
NUCB Business School — Nagoya, 
Newcastle Business School, University of Newcastle, Australia — Newcastle,

O
Open University Business School — 
Otago Business School (Otago University) —

P
Peter B. Gustavson School of Business (University of Victoria) — Victoria, 
Pontifical Catholic University of Chile's School of Administration (Pontifical Catholic University of Chile) — Santiago,

Q
QUT Business School (Queensland University of Technology) — Brisbane, 
Queen's School of Business (Queen's University) — Kingston, 
Quinn School of Business (University College Dublin) — Dublin,

R
Reims Management School — Reims, 
Richard Ivey School of Business (Western Ontario University) — London, 
Rotterdam School of Management, Erasmus University (Erasmus University Rotterdam) — Rotterdam, 
Rouen Business School — Rouen,

S
Saïd Business School (University of Oxford) — Oxford, 
Sauder School of Business (British Columbia University) — Vancouver, 
School of Business (Singapore National University) — 
School of Business Administration (Southwestern University of Finance and Economics) — Chengdu, 
School of Business and Management (Hong Kong University of Science and Technology) — Hong Kong, 
School of Business, Economics and Law (Gothenburg University) — Gothenburg, 
School of Economics and Management (Tsinghua University) — Beijing, 
School of Management (Fudan University) — Shanghai, 
SDA Bocconi School of Management (Bocconi University) — Milan, 
SGH Warsaw School of Economics — Warsaw, 
Sheffield University Management School, University of Sheffield — Sheffield, 
Skema Business School —  (Lille, Paris, Nice/Sophia-Antipolis),  (Raleigh),  (Suzhou);  (Belo Horizonte)  
Solvay Brussels School of Economics and Management (Université Libre de Bruxelles) — Brussels, 
St. Gallen University — St. Gallen, 
University of Stellenbosch Business School (Stellenbosch University) — Stellenbosch, 
Stockholm School of Economics — Stockholm, 
Strathclyde Business School (Strathclyde University) — Glasgow,

T
Monterrey Institute of Technology and Higher Education— Monterrey, 
Telfer School of Management (Ottawa University) — Ottawa, 
Toulouse Business School — Toulouse, 
Thammasat Business School — Bangkok, 
TUM School of Management — Munich, 
Trinity College Dublin — Dublin,

U
Université Paris-Dauphine, 
University College Dublin  — 
University of Cologne, 
University of Edinburgh Business School (University of Edinburgh) — Edinburgh, 
University of Groningen, Faculty of Economics and Business — 
University of International Business and Economics — Beijing, 
University of Liverpool Management School, University of Liverpool — Liverpool, 
University of Queensland Business School (Queensland University) — 
University of Sydney Business School, University of Sydney, (5 years) —

V
Vienna University of Economics and Business — Vienna, 
Vlerick Leuven Gent Management School (Ghent University and Leuven Catholic University) — Ghent and Leuven,

W
Waikato Management School (Waikato University) — Hamilton, 
Warwick Business School (Warwick University) — Coventry, 
University of Western Australia Business School (University of Western Australia) — Perth, 
Victoria Business School (Victoria University of Wellington)- Wellington, New Zealand
Westminster Business School (University of Westminster) — London, 
WHU – Otto Beisheim School of Management — Vallendar,

See also
 List of business schools in Europe
 List of institutions accredited by AMBA
 Triple accreditation

References

External links 
 https://web.archive.org/web/20140216071831/http://www.efmd.org/index.php/accreditation-main/equis/accredited-schools

School accreditors
Lists of universities and colleges